Mark Isherwood (born January 31, 1989) is a Canadian retired ice hockey defenceman.

Isherwood played four seasons (2006-2010) of major junior hockey with the Medicine Hat Tigers of the Western Hockey League, scoring 128 points and registering 353 penalty minutes in 268 games played.

During his rookie 2010–11 ECHL season with the Alaska Aces, Isherwood was a member of the Kelly Cup championship team, and he led all ECHL defensemen with 15 goals and 11 power-play goals. He was recognized for his outstanding play by being named to the ECHL All-Rookie Team.

Career statistics

Awards and honours

References

External links

1989 births
Living people
Alaska Aces (ECHL) players
Arizona Sundogs players
Canadian ice hockey defencemen
Ducs d'Angers players
Hamilton Bulldogs (AHL) players
Medicine Hat Tigers players
San Francisco Bulls players
SG Cortina players
Utah Grizzlies (ECHL) players
Canadian expatriate ice hockey players in Italy